Rodrigo de Arriaga (17 January 1592 – 7 June 1667) was a Spanish philosopher, theologian and Jesuit. He is known as one of the foremost Spanish Jesuits of his day and as a leading representative of post-Suárezian baroque Jesuit nominalism.

Life 
Born in 1592, at Logroño in Castile, he joined the Society of Jesus on September 17, 1606, when he was 14 years old. He studied philosophy and theology under Pedro Hurtado de Mendoza and taught philosophy (1620–1623) and theology (1624) in Valladolid and theology in Salamanca (1624–1625). On November 12, 1623, he was professed of the four vows.

In 1625 he was sent to the University of Prague, where he remained for the rest of his life. Arriaga served as professor of theology from 1626, shortly after his arrival, until 1637, when he became prefect of studies in the theology faculty. He held that position until 1642, when he became chancellor of the Clementinum, remaining in this post until 1654. In 1654 he was again appointed prefect of studies and retained this position until his death. Arriaga gained a wide reputation, not only in Spain, but all over Europe. So great was his intellectual authority and his fame as a teacher that he was the subject of a popular quip: "Pragam videre, Arriagam audire"—"To see Prague, to hear Arriaga". The province of Bohemia three times made him a deputy to Rome to attend the General Congregation of the Jesuit Order. He was highly esteemed by Urban VIII, Innocent X, and the Emperor Ferdinand III. He died in Prague on June 17, 1667.

Arriaga was a good friend and colleague of the Belgian mathematician Grégoire de Saint-Vincent. When, after the Battle of Breitenfeld, the Saxons pillaged Prague and set fire to many parts of the city, it was Arriaga who saved Saint-Vincent's manuscripts from destruction.

Arriaga occupies an important place in the history of modern philosophy. Arriaga had studied with attention the recent writings of the anti-Aristotelians; and, giving effect to many of the opinions advanced by them, he endeavoured by modifications and concessions to adapt to modern use the logic and metaphysics, but still more the physical hypotheses, of his scholastic masters. In this attempt at compromise he went further than any other scholastic philosopher of the seventeenth century. In his own day, as a Jesuit teaching the doctrines then approved by his order, he was indeed safe from any serious charge of heterodoxy; but his position as an innovator laid him open to many attacks from the uncompromising adherents of the Aristotelian school. He was openly denounced as a sceptic, and accused of wilfully suppressing or weakening the answers to plausible objections against the system which he professed to teach. Opposers of Aristotelianism, on the other hand, like the Platonist philosopher Jan Marek Marci, seized upon Arriaga's concessions as proving the unsoundness of the foundations upon which the Aristotelian philosophy rests.

Influence 

Very innovative in metaphysics and natural philosophy (he defended heliocentrism despite the ecclesiastical prohibitions), Arriaga approached scholastic scholarship in a critical manner and with sympathy for nominalist philosophy. He rejected the ontological argument, denying the possibility of demonstrating a priori the existence of God. He mantained that immortality can be proven as only probable, namely from the soul's inclination towards perpetuity. 

Arriaga displays an original approach to natural philosophy, interest in the critical scientific spirit of the time, and familiarity with the new experimental science, quite unusual among the scholastics. Regarding the structure of the universe, he accepted the fluid nature of planetary space, though he rejected the arguments from astronomical observations. He gave up most of the opinions of Scholastic authorities in point of natural philosophy, such as the composition of the continuum, rarefaction, etc. and undertook to defend the innovators in philosophy. While the Revisers General attempted to enforce uniformity within the Society, Arriaga called for greater liberty in philosophy. In the preface of the first edition of his  (1632) he argued explicitly in favour of new opinions. Was there not just as much genius in Thomas, Cajetan, Molina, and Suàrez as in the ancients? Since we have studied much since the ancients, he wondered, "why then is it not proper for us to deduce new conclusions?" Antiquity was no guarantee of the truth of any opinion, for in his view it was truly amazing how many ancient opinions had virtually no foundation but were based simply on the badly understood authority of Aristotle or some other philosopher.

In his , Pierre Bayle praises him for his sceptical method and ability to destroy rival theories, considered by Bayle as essential to philosophy. Arriaga exerted a strong influence on the Czech physician Jan Marek Marci, on the Italian scholar Valeriano Magni and on the Spanish philosopher and scientist Juan Caramuel y Lobkowitz. The German philosopher Gottfried Wilhelm Leibniz used his works extensively. It can also be assumed that Descartes's treatment of the problems of rarefaction and condensation (Principia II, 5-6) is influenced by Arriaga.

His work was, however, sometimes controversial. Arriaga was accused of supporting the Zenonist doctrine of quantity. This doctrine, which asserted that quantity consisted of points, had been repeatedly and strenuously rejected by the revisers general as incompatible with the orthodox account of Eucharist. However, the routine reissuing of such injunctions and the unflagging efforts of the censors to expunge such a doctrine from Jesuit books attest to the continued dissemination of zenonism within the Order. In a letter from General Vincenzo Carafa, Arriaga was named as the source of the diffusion of this doctrine in Germany. The text in question was doubtless his philosophy textbook, which enjoyed wide circulation throughout the German Province of the Society of Jesus.

Works 
Arriaga published two massive works:

  Arriaga's  has been reprinted several times: Paris, 1637, 1639; Lyon, 1644, 1647, 1653, 1659, 1669;
 . This ponderous series of dissertations on Thomas Aquinas was published in successive volumes as follows: vols. I and II Disputationes in Primam Partem, Antwerp, 1643; Lyon, 1644, 1669; vols. III and IV Disputationes in Primam Secundae, Antwerp, 1644; Lyon, 1669; vol. V Disputationes in Secundam Secundae, Antwerp, 1649; Lyon 1651; vols. VI, VII and VIII Disputationes in Tertiam Partem, Antwerp, 1650–55; Lyon, 1654-1669.

References

Further reading 
  
 
 
 
 
 
 
 
 
 
 
 
 
 
 
 
 
 
 Arriaga, Rodrigo de, in Quintín Aldea Vaquero; Tomás Marín Martínez; José Vives Gatell (eds.), Diccionario de Historia Eclesiástica de España, vol. I, Madrid, Consejo Superior de Investigaciones Científicas, Instituto Enrique Flórez, 1972, p. 113;
 
 
 
 
 
 
 
 
 
 
 
 
 Jean-Robert Armogathe, Dubium perfectissimum: The Skepticism of the 'Subtle Arriaga', in: Scepticism as a Force in Renaissance and Post-Renaissance Thought. New Interpretations, ed. by José Raimundo Maia Neto and Richard H. Popkin, Amherst, New York, Humanity Books, 2004, 107-121.
 
 
 
 

Spanish philosophers
17th-century Spanish Jesuits
1592 births
1667 deaths
Jesuit philosophers
Metaphysicians
Catholic philosophers
Scholastic philosophers
People from Logroño
Academic staff of Charles University
17th-century Spanish Roman Catholic theologians
17th-century Spanish writers
Aristotelian philosophers